Lego Prince of Persia was a Lego theme based on the video game Prince of Persia: The Sands of Time and the film of the same name. It was licensed from Walt Disney Pictures and Jerry Bruckheimer Films. The theme was first introduced in 2010. The Lego theme was discontinued by the end of 2011.

Overview
Lego Prince of Persia was based on the film. The focus of the product line was Prince Dastan battling against Nizam and Hassansin.

During Jake Gyllenhaal's appearance on Jimmy Kimmel Live! last night, Jake brought along his 18-inch tall Lego doll replicating his character Dastan from Prince of Persia and surprised the host Jimmy Kimmel with his own Lego doll designed to personally depict the late-night host.

Launch
The Lego Prince of Persia theme was launched at the American International Toy Fair in 2010. As part of the marketing campaign, The Lego Group released five Lego sets based on the film.

Promotion and release
In early 2009, Disney and Lego announced a multi-year plan to produce Lego sets based on Disney films. In a press release they announced plans for three Disney themes – Cars, Prince of Persia and Toy Story. To coincide with the release of the new movie, Prince of Persia: The Sands of Time, Lego released a short Lego animated film based on the events of the movie. It was narrated by Jake Gyllenhaal who played Prince Dastan in the movie.

Construction sets
According to Bricklink, The Lego Group released a total of six Lego sets and a promotional polybag as part of Lego Prince of Persia theme. It was discontinued by the end of 2011.

The five sets were released in the United States on April 12, 2010, and in the United Kingdom on April 19. In addition, Dagger Trap (set number: 20017) was released in 2010 as an exclusive, available with a subscription of Lego's Brickmaster Magazine.

Desert Attack
Desert Attack (set number: 7569) was released on 12 April 2010. The set consisted of 67 pieces with 4 minifigures. The set featured a desert setting, horse, snake and four minifigures of Dastan, a hatchet hassansin, a claw hassansin and a skeleton.

The Ostrich Race
The Ostrich Race (set number: 7570) was released on 12 April 2010. The set consisted of 169 pieces with 3 minifigures. The set featured a platform, a set of gates, two ostriches and three minifigures of Dastan, Sheik Amar and an ostrich jockey.

The Fight for the Dagger
The Fight for the Dagger (set number: 7571) was released on 12 April 2010. The set consisted of 258 pieces with 4 minifigures. The set featured a building from the Alamut market, a market stall, a camel and four minifigures of Dastan, Princess Tamina, Asoka and an Alamut merchant.

Quest Against Time
Quest Against Time (set number: 7572) was released on 12 April 2010. The set consisted of 506 pieces with 4 minifigures. The set featured a trap-filled passage, a rock setting with the Sands of Time and four minifigures of Princess Tamina, Dastan, Nizam and Zolm.

Battle of Alamut
Battle of Alamut (set number: 7573) was released on 12 April 2010. The set consisted of 821 pieces with 7 minifigures. The set featured the Alamut castle, a camel and seven minifigures of Dastan, Nizam, Seso, two Alamat guards, Gool and Tamah.

Reception 
In 2011, The Lego Group reported that due to the Lego Toy Story, Lego Prince of Persia, Lego Pirates of the Caribbean and Lego Cars 2 lines, it had for the first time in its 50-year history in the American market surpassed $1.0 billion in consumer sales of Lego products, reaching its highest share of construction toys and total U.S. toy market ever.

See also 
 Lego Avatar
 Lego Toy Story
 Lego Cars
 Lego Disney
 Lego Pirates of the Caribbean
 Lego The Lone Ranger
 Lego The Angry Birds Movie
 Lego Minecraft
 Lego Overwatch
 Lego Super Mario

References

External links

Prince of Persia
Prince of Persia
Prince of Persia
Prince of Persia
Products introduced in 2010
Products and services discontinued in 2011